Vitula lugubrella is a species of snout moth in the genus Vitula. It was described by Émile Louis Ragonot in 1887. It is found in North America, including California.

There are probably multiple generations per year.

The larvae live within the dried galls of Atrusca wasps which occur on gray oak (Quercus grisea). Young larvae feed just inside the outer covering of the gall on the fibrous material that constitutes most of the internal structure. Older larvae also feed on these fibers but may also tunnel through the center of the gall. Pupation takes place in a loosely woven silk cocoon within the gall.

References

Moths described in 1887
Phycitini